The 1989–90 Wisconsin Badgers men's basketball team represented the University of Wisconsin as a member of the Big Ten Conference during the 1989–90 NCAA Division I men's basketball season. The team was coached by Steve Yoder, coaching his eighth season with Wisconsin. The Badgers finished 14-17, 4-14 in Big Ten play to finish in eighth place.

Offseason 
Yoder's top assistant Brad McNulty, suspended without pay since August 1, 1989, was fired just prior to his eighth season at Wisconsin for billing personal phone calls to the university from January 1988 to May 1989. McNulty made 51 calls to Nevada hotel casinos, which cost the university over $2,000 and resulted in a felony charge.

Awards and honors 
Danny Jones was named Second Team All-Big Ten by the media at the conclusion of the season.

Roster

Schedule and results 

|-
!colspan=8| Regular Season
|-

Player statistics

References

Wisconsin Badgers men's basketball seasons
Wisconsin
Wisconsin Badgers men's basketball
Wisconsin Badgers men's basketball